Pavlics is a Hungarian-language form of the Slavic surname  Pavlić or Pavlič. Notable people with the surname include:

Ferenc Pavlics (born 1928), Hungarian-born American mechanical engineer, a developer of the Apollo Lunar rover
Irén Pavlics (Slovene: Irena Pavlič), Hungarian Slovene author and editor

Hungarian-language surnames
Surnames of Slavic origin